Utah State Route 62 (SR-62) is a state highway in the U.S. state of Utah.

Route description

The route begins on US-89 just south of Junction and proceeds east through the city of Kingston and into Kingston Canyon alongside the East Fork Sevier River. Continuing north-northeast through Grass Valley, the route passes through the towns of Angle, Greenwich, and Koosharem. The route turns to the northwest as it passes by Burrville, exits Grass Valley, and enters Plateau Valley shortly before it ends at its intersection with SR-24.

History
The road from Plateau Junction to SR-22 was designated a state highway in 1931 as State Route 62. In 1953, a spur was added to the town of Burrville. In 1962, the route was realigned along Otter Creek Reservoir to a new road slightly to the west. In 1967, the portion of SR-22 from former SR-11 (US-89) was reassigned to SR-62. In 1969, the Burrville spur was removed.

Major intersections

References

External links

062
 062
 062